The 1911 Michigan State Normal Normalites football team was an American football team that represented Michigan State Normal College (later renamed Eastern Michigan University) as an independent during the 1911 college football season.  In their first and only season under head coach Dwight Wilson, the Normalites compiled a 3–4 record and were outscored by a total of 71 to 43.  Guy A. Durgan was the team captain.

Schedule

References

Michigan State Normal
Eastern Michigan Eagles football seasons
Michigan State Normal Normalites football